Oenopota triphera is a species of sea snail, a marine gastropod mollusk in the family Mangeliidae.

Description

Distribution
This species occurs in the Sea of Japan.

References

External links
  Golikov, Alexandr N., and Orest A. Scarlato. "Ecology of bottom biocoenoses in the Possjet Bay (the Sea of Japan) and the peculiarities of their distribution in connection with physical and chemical conditions of the habitat." Helgoländer wissenschaftliche Meeresuntersuchungen 15.1 (1967): 193.
 

triphera
Gastropods described in 1967